Shehnai   is a 1947 Indian Bollywood film directed by  P. L. Santoshi, starring  Kishore Kumar, Indumati, Radhakrishan, V.H. Desai and Rehana. It was the fifth highest grossing Indian film of 1947. Santoshi went on make the classic, Barsaat Ki Raat (1960) starring Madhubala and Bharat Bhushan.

Cast
 Nasir Khan as Rajesh
 Rehana as Prameela
 Indumati as Zamindar's Daughter
 Kishore Kumar as Police Inspector
 Dulari
 Leela Mishra
 Mumtaz Ali 
 Niranjan Sharma
 Kumkum
 S.L. Puri
 Rekha 
 Radhakishan as Zamindar's Secretary
 Shreenath
 Shobha Thakur
 V. H. Desai as Comedian

Soundtrack
Music of the film was given by C. Ramchandra and lyrics were by P. L. Santoshi.

References

External links
 

1947 films
1940s Hindi-language films
Films scored by C. Ramchandra
Indian romance films
1940s romance films
Indian black-and-white films
Hindi-language romance films